FQR may refer to:

 Finch's Quarterly Review, an international luxury magazine which publishes articles about glamour and style
 First Quench Retailing, a defunct British retail chain